Thomas Devitt may refer to:

Thomas Devitt of Devitt and Moore
Sir Thomas Devitt, 1st Baronet (1839–1923), of the Devitt baronets
Sir Thomas Gordon Devitt, 2nd Baronet (1902–1995), of the Devitt baronets
Thomas Devitt (rugby union), List of England national rugby union players

See also
Devitt (surname)